Caragana bicolor is a species of flowering plants within the family Fabaceae. It is an endemic species in found in  China.

References

Flora of China
Hedysareae